Coleophora paracousiniae is a moth of the family Coleophoridae.

References

paracousiniae
Moths described in 1994